Qoli Laleh-ye Olya (also Romanized as Qolī Lāleh-ye ‘Olyā; also known as Qolī Lāleh Bālā and Qolī Lāleh-ye Bālā) is a village in Qolqol Rud Rural District, Qolqol Rud District, Tuyserkan County, Hamadan Province, Iran. At the 2006 census, its population was 42, in 10 families.

References 

Populated places in Tuyserkan County